Year 469 (CDLXIX) was a common year starting on Wednesday (link will display the full calendar) of the Julian calendar. At the time, it was known as the Year of the Consulship of Marcianus and Zeno (or, less frequently, year 1222 Ab urbe condita). The denomination 469 for this year has been used since the early medieval period, when the Anno Domini calendar era became the prevalent method in Europe for naming years.

Events 
 By place 

 Roman Empire 
 Ostrogoth prince Theodoric, age 15, returns to Pannonia, after living as a child hostage at the court of Emperor Leo I in Constantinople (see 459).

 Europe 
 
 The Vandals invade Epirus (modern Greece). They are expelled from the Peloponnese (Greece) and in retaliation, the Vandals take 500 hostages at Zakynthos. On the way back to Carthage theyare slaughtered.  
 King Euric declares himself independent from the Western Roman Empire. He extends the Visigothic power in Hispania;  conquering the cities of Pamplona, Zaragoza and Mérida.

 By topic 

 Religion 
 The Vatican makes a pact with the Salian Frankish king Childeric I, agreeing to call him "the new Constantine" on condition that he accept conversion to Christianity.

Births 
 Zhou She, high official of the Liang Dynasty (d. 524)

Deaths 
 Dengizich, king of the Huns (approximate date)
 Hydatius, bishop of Aquae Flaviae (approximate date)

References